The seventh term of the Government of the Republic of Poland is the term of the Government that ran from 8 November 2011 to 11 November 2015.

Officers

Members of Sejm

See also
 2011 Polish parliamentary election
 List of Polish senators (2011–15)
 List of Sejm members (2007–11) - former term

References